Getenesh "Gete" Wami Degife (Amharic: ጌጤነሽ 'ጌጤ' ዋሚ ደግፌ born December 11, 1974 in Debre Berhan) is an Ethiopian former long-distance runner who competed in cross country, track, and road events.

Her brother, Mulugeta Wami, is also a professional marathon runner.

Biography
Gete won gold medal at the 1999 World Championships in Seville, timing 30:24.56, which was a new African record and Championships Record. She also won the 10,000 m gold medal at the 1999 All-Africa Games that year. She is a two-time winner of the IAAF World Cross Country Championships, having taken the long race title in 1996 and then the short race title in 2001.

Gete won the 2006 Berlin Marathon, finishing in front of Salina Kosgei and Monika Drybulska on September 24. She was expected to beat the world record over 15 km during the Zevenheuvelenloop in and around Nijmegen on 19 November 2006, but failed. Gete finished in second position during the race, nine seconds behind Mestewat Tufa, who finished in 47:22.

In 2007, Gete won the Berlin Marathon again. She competed in the New York Marathon thirty-five days later and she finished 23 seconds behind Paula Radcliffe. Her second-place finish gave her the World Marathon Majors Series Title, earning herself the $500,000 jackpot.

In August 2008, Gete Wami dropped out of the 2008 Beijing Olympic Marathon, after running in the lead pack for much of the race, as did her teammate Berhane Adere.

The last outing of her career came at the 2009 London Marathon, where her run of 2:26:54 hours brought her ninth place.

International competitions

Road races

References

External links

1974 births
Living people
Sportspeople from Amhara Region
Ethiopian female long-distance runners
Ethiopian female marathon runners
Olympic athletes of Ethiopia
Olympic silver medalists for Ethiopia
Olympic bronze medalists for Ethiopia
Athletes (track and field) at the 1996 Summer Olympics
Athletes (track and field) at the 2000 Summer Olympics
Athletes (track and field) at the 2008 Summer Olympics
World Athletics Championships athletes for Ethiopia
World Athletics Championships medalists
World Athletics Cross Country Championships winners
Medalists at the 2000 Summer Olympics
Medalists at the 1996 Summer Olympics
Olympic silver medalists in athletics (track and field)
Olympic bronze medalists in athletics (track and field)
African Games gold medalists for Ethiopia
African Games medalists in athletics (track and field)
Athletes (track and field) at the 1995 All-Africa Games
World Athletics Championships winners
20th-century Ethiopian women
21st-century Ethiopian women